They Were the First is a Soviet full-length black-and-white film, staged at the Moscow Gorky Film Studio in 1956, directed by Yuri Yegorov. At the heart of the script is the play by Józef Printsev.

The film premiered in the USSR on May 15, 1956.

Plot 
1918. Troubled in Petrograd. The enemy ring is already tightening around the revolutionary city. Work shelves are leaving for the front. The struggle against the enemies of Soviet power goes not only on the outskirts of the city, but also in the rear. Komsomol organizations are being created at this harsh and difficult time for the revolution at the behest of the Bolshevik Party on the workers' outskirts. The first young workers join the Young Communist League – Stepan Barabash, Sanya Chizhik, Glasha, Kuzma. After some hesitation and meditation, the peasant boy Fyodor, who came from a remote village to work in St. Petersburg, and the gymnast Zhenya Gorovsky become peasants. In days of intense battles, young patriots, together with detachments of the Workers' Guards, go to defend Petrograd.

About the first Komsomol members Petrograd, who rose to defend the Soviet power.

Cast
 Georgi Yumatov as Stepan Barabash
 Liliana Alyoshnikova as Glasha  
 Mark Bernes as Rodionov
 Mikhail Ulyanov as Alexey Kolyvanov
Mikhail Derzhavin as Yevgeny Gorovskoy, student and poet
Nina Krachkovskaya as Yelena
 Mikhail Kondratiev as  Lenin

Literature 
Nina Zorkaya. Soviet historical and revolutionary film. –   Moscow: Academy of Sciences of the USSR, 1962. –  217 pages.

References

External links

1956 films
Russian Civil War films
Soviet war drama films
Soviet black-and-white films
Gorky Film Studio films
1950s war drama films
1956 drama films